This is a chronological list of people who were born in, have been residents of, or have been otherwise closely associated with the city of Ashtabula, Ohio, United States, and its surrounding metropolitan area, including Ashtabula County.

Individuals not born in Ashtabula are denoted with an asterisk (*).

(1795-1864) Joshua Reed Giddings, politician *
(1800-1864) Platt Rogers Spencer, teacher, penmanship innovator *
(1800-1878) Benjamin Wade, U.S. Senator *
(1810-1876) Betsy Mix Cowles, feminist and abolitionist *
(1817-1883) Charles Case, U.S. Representative *
(1825-1909) Matthew Turner, shipbuilder
(1835-1905) Decius Wade, the "father of Montana jurisprudence"
(1838-1905) Albion W. Tourgée, soldier, lawyer, judge, novelist, diplomat
(1841-1919) Louis C. Shepard, Union Navy sailor
(1857-1933) Francis Joseph Hall, theologian
(1858-1942) Jesse Fuller McDonald, civil engineer, surveyor
(1862-1924) Chester Hardy Aldrich, Governor of Nebraska
(1890s-1942) T-Bone Slim, songwriter, hobo, IWW labor activist
(1893-1967) Charles E. Burchfield, artist
(1906-1975) Pete Rasmus, athlete  
(born 1921) Maila Nurmi, actress *
(born 1926) Ken Meyer, football coach
(born 1943) Don Novello, actor and comedian
(born 1954) Mark Wagner, professional baseball player, Detroit Tigers, Oakland A's, Texas Rangers; Triple A coach 
(born 1964) Urban F. Meyer, football coach, sportscaster
(born 1968) Jarrod Bunch, football player
(born 1972) Tammy Cochran, singer *
(born 1972) Brian James Anderson, baseball pitcher
(born 1973) Danielle Nicolet, actress 
(born 1987) Danica Dillon, Pornographic actress
(born 1988) Freddie Smith, Soap Opera Actor Days Of Our Lives

References

Ashtabula, Ohio
Ashtabula
Ashtabula, Ohio